St Luke's, Redcliffe Gardens, is an Anglican church in Redcliffe Gardens, bordering on Redcliffe Square, London. It was built in 1872–73 to designs by George and Henry Godwin. It has been Grade II listed since 2003.

Pevsner describes it as "the last and the grandest of the three Kensington churches by the Godwins". The other two are St Mary, The Boltons (1849–50) and St Jude's, Courtfield Gardens (1870). It's chiefly remarkable for the quantity of sculptural embellishment, he says, including the celebration of Psalm 150 in the sanctuary.

During the early 1950s composer Francis Routh began holding new music concerts in the church that led to the Redcliffe Festival between 1957 and 1961, and to the formation of the Redcliffe Concerts of British Music series (1963-1989).

References

External links
 
 

Grade II listed churches in the Royal Borough of Kensington and Chelsea
Church of England church buildings in the Royal Borough of Kensington and Chelsea